Georgi Petrov (born 6 July 1991) is a Bulgarian footballer who plays as a forward.

Career
Born in Plovdiv Petrov start to play football in Lokomotiv Plovdiv. He made his official debut in Lokomotiv's first team on November 9, 2009 replacing Hristian Popov in the 87th minute in the A PFG home match against Minyor Pernik (3–3).

In February 2015, Petrov signed for Greek club Glyfada.
In January 2016, he signed for Cypriot club Nikos & Sokratis Erimis.
On 9 January 2017, Petrov joined Sozopol. His contract expired at the end of the year and was not renewed due to frequent injuries.

References

External links
 Profile at LPortala 
 
 

Living people
1991 births
Footballers from Plovdiv
Bulgarian footballers
First Professional Football League (Bulgaria) players
Second Professional Football League (Bulgaria) players
Cypriot Second Division players
Association football forwards
PFC Lokomotiv Plovdiv players
OFC Sliven 2000 players
PFC Pirin Gotse Delchev players
A.O. Glyfada players
Nikos & Sokratis Erimis FC players
FC Sozopol players
Bulgarian expatriate footballers
Bulgarian expatriate sportspeople in Greece
Bulgarian expatriate sportspeople in Cyprus
Expatriate footballers in Greece
Expatriate footballers in Cyprus